Toño Cedeño (born May 20, 1970) is a doctor in art history, theologian, oculist, visual artist and founder of the Oqli Collection.

Studies 
He studied optometry at the Superior School of Medicine Instituto Politécnico Nacional, IPN . He later studied for a master's degree in Theology at the Universidad Iberoamericana. In 2005 he obtained a Doctorate in Art History from Casa Lamm, with the thesis 'The female image on Mexican banknotes'.

Among his teachers are Dr. Margarita Martínez Lámbarry, Dr. Teresa del Conde, Master Jorge Alberto Manrique Castañeda, Dr. Claudia Gómez Haro, and Dr. Tomas Pérez Vejo.

Creative career 
In his youth he made trips to the city of Oaxaca, and the artisan and visual arts culture of that state influenced his closeness to the world of art. In his work of collage and painting, he approaches pop art, and naif art. He has also worked as curator in events such as the exhibition dedicated to Pedro Infante in 2017, at the Centro de Arte Bicentenario Poeta Hugo Gutiérrez Vega.

Art Exhibitions 
SOLO SHOWS
Flores de Ingenua ingenuidad. Casa de la Cultura de Tlalpan. Mexico City. 2019
San Antoñito. Escuela de Bellas Artes de Toluca. 2012 
Toño Cedeño Collages. Instituto Iconos. Mexico City. 2011

GROUP SHOWS 
“IN CVT WE TRVST”, Museo del Juguete Antiguo México, México (MUJAM), México, 2018.
Mujeres de Hoy. Casa de Cultura STUNAM. / Suburbano. 2014. 
Trazo presente, Gal. Ligia Fenollosa. 2013.

PERFORMANCE 
Participation in the performance tribute to Frida Kahlo, by Iris México, in front of the Palacio de Bellas Artes, in 2007.

Oqli Collection

Through an exchange program of glasses for works of arts and crafts, he has gathered a large collection of works for more than a decade.

Part of this collection has been promoted in collective exhibitions, the first of these in 2013, entitled Oqli Collection: Portraits, with works by Claudia Ramos, Iris Atma (Iris México), Jorge Granados, Dunkel Galicia, Carlos Bautista, América Rodríguez, J.Macdonald Henry, Hugo Navarro, Blanca Dorantes, Alejandro Pereyra, among others.

It has also dedicated other events to the women artists in the collection.

Among the publications of this project we can mention the book Hojas Paralelas.

References 

1970 births
Mexican artists
Living people